Four Kings is an American television sitcom that aired on NBC from January 5 to March 16, 2006, as a part of winter 2006 programming, but was cancelled before the end of the season. It starred Seth Green, Josh Cooke, Shane McRae, and Todd Grinnell. The show was created by David Kohan and Max Mutchnick, both of whom created Will & Grace.

The show centers on four childhood friends who live in New York City. The show's theme is "Hanginaround" by Counting Crows. Four Kings was pulled from NBC's schedule after its airing on March 16, 2006, and on May 15, 2006, NBC confirmed the show's cancellation. Two of the show's stars had already signed on to new projects, which did not bode well for the show's chances of renewal. Though NBC originally announced that they would air the remaining episodes beginning May 25, 2006, they did not follow through. The unaired episodes would eventually air in syndication on the Living network in the UK, and on the Nine Network in Australia.

Cast
Seth Green as Barry Klein
Todd Grinnell as Jason
Shane McRae as Bobby
Josh Cooke as Ben Wolf
Kathryn Hahn as Sharon
Kate Micucci as Toni
Rachelle Lefevre as Lauren

Episodes

References

External links
 
 Four Kings at EpisodeWorld

NBC original programming
2006 American television series debuts
2006 American television series endings
2000s American sitcoms
Television series by Warner Bros. Television Studios
English-language television shows
Television shows set in New York City